Cláudio Rodrigues Gomes (born 29 August 1998), commonly known as Guga, is a Brazilian footballer who plays for Fluminense as a right back.

Club career
Born in Rio de Janeiro, Guga started playing futsal at the age of five. After having spent five years with the youth setup of Botafogo, he joined the academy of Avaí in 2013 and signed a contract, which would keep him at the club till 2018. He played regularly for the reserves and scored three times in the 2017 Copa do Brasil Sub-20 against Grêmio, Fluminense and Palmeiras.

Avaí
On 8 January 2018, Guga was promoted to the senior team of Avaí and went on to participate in the pre-season held at Águas Mornas. On 15 February, he scored his first professional goal in a 3–1 victory against Brusque in Campeonato Catarinense. On 14 April, he made his Série B debut in a 1–0 defeat against Vila Nova. On 26 May, he scored his first Série B goal for the club in a 3–1 victory against Paysandu.

Altético Mineiro
On 28 December 2018, Guga signed with Atlético Mineiro.

Fluminense
On 14 December 2022, Guga joined Fluminense on a three-year deal.

Personal life
Guga is nicknamed as Guga because of the similarity of his hair style with that of tennis player Gustavo Kuerten.

Club statistics

Honours
Atlético Mineiro
Campeonato Brasileiro Série A: 2021
Copa do Brasil: 2021
Campeonato Mineiro: 2020, 2021, 2022
Supercopa do Brasil: 2022

Brazil U23
Toulon Tournament: 2019

References

External links

Avaí Futebol Clube  profile

 
1998 births
Living people
Footballers from Rio de Janeiro (city)
Association football defenders
Brazilian footballers
Campeonato Brasileiro Série A players
Campeonato Brasileiro Série B players
Avaí FC players
Clube Atlético Mineiro players
Fluminense FC players
Brazil youth international footballers